Sorbus thibetica (康藏花楸), the Tibetan whitebeam, is a species of flowering plant in the family Rosaceae, native to south western China and the Himalayas. Like other whitebeams, the undersides of the leaves are white, giving a dramatic effect when the wind blows through them.

The more compact cultivar 'John Mitchell' has gained the Royal Horticultural Society's Award of Garden Merit.

References

Flora of Tibet
thibetica
Trees of Nepal